Ellsworth Faris (September 30, 1874 – December 19, 1953) was an influential sociologist of the Chicago school.

Faris was born in 1874 in Salem, Tennessee.  He studied at Texas Christian University, where he earned his bachelor's degree in 1894 and master's degree in 1896.  From 1897 to 1904, he spent time in Belgian Congo as a missionary.  When he returned from Africa, Faris earned his Ph.D. at the University of Chicago, and was hired into the department.

Faris was chair of the Department of Sociology and Anthropology at the University of Chicago, and served as president of the American Sociological Society in 1937.  Among his works, Faris authored The Nature of Human Nature in 1937.

References

External links

American sociologists
Presidents of the American Sociological Association
1874 births
1953 deaths
American Journal of Sociology editors